The Theakston's Old Peculier Crime Novel of the Year Award is one of the UK's top crime-fiction awards, sponsored by Theakston's Old Peculier. It is awarded annually at Harrogate Crime Writing Festival in the UK, held every July, as part of the Harrogate International Festivals. The winner receives £3000 and a small hand-carved oak beer cask carved by one of Britain's last coopers. Novels eligible are those crime novels published in paperback any time during the previous year. Voting is by the public with decisions of a jury-panel also taken into account, a fact not-much publicised by the award organisers, who are keen to emphasize the public-voting aspect of the award.

Recipients

References

Mystery and detective fiction awards
British literary awards
Awards established in 2005
2005 establishments in the United Kingdom